Noora Riikka Koponen (born 12 July 1983 in Kokkola) is a Finnish politician currently serving in the Parliament of Finland for the Green League at the Uusimaa constituency.

References

1983 births
Living people
People from Kokkola
Green League politicians
Members of the Parliament of Finland (2019–23)
21st-century Finnish women politicians
Women members of the Parliament of Finland